MTV ao Vivo – Eletrodoméstico is the second live album by Brazilian singer Daniela Mercury, released on April 22, 2003. It was recorded as an MTV ao Vivo special in early 2003. Two songs from the album "Dona da Banca" and "Meu Plano" were released as singles.

Track listing

References 

2003 live albums
Daniela Mercury albums
RCA Records live albums